Buolhasan or Bowalhasan or Bu ol Hasan, also rendered as Bolhasan, may refer to:
 Buolhasan, Ilam
 Bowalhasan, Kurdistan
 Bowalhasan Rural District, in Kurdistan Province